Hinton Parva, also known as Little Hinton, is a village in the Borough of Swindon in Wiltshire, England. Hinton Parva was a separate civil parish until 1934, and is now in the parish of Bishopstone.

Parts of the village were taken over by the War Department during World War II in 1943 to store tanks.

The Norman parish church of St Swithun is a Grade I listed building. An area around the church was designated a conservation area in 1990.

References

Sources and further reading

Villages in Wiltshire
Borough of Swindon
Former civil parishes in Wiltshire